Laid Back is a Danish electronic music duo group from Copenhagen, formed in 1979. The duo consists of John Guldberg (vocals, guitar, bass) and Tim Stahl (vocals, keyboards, drums, bass). They are best known for the hits "Sunshine Reggae" and "White Horse" from 1983 and "Bakerman" from 1989.

Background and origins
John Guldberg and Tim Stahl met in the mid-1970s, and they played together in a group called the Starbox Band. After a poorly received show supporting the Kinks, the band split up, but the duo continued working together. Guldberg set up a small studio in downtown Copenhagen where the two musicians began exploring the possibilities that were being opened up by new technologies, such as multitrack tape recorders, synthesizers and drum machines.

Recordings

1981-89

Their debut album, simply titled Laid Back, was released in 1981, and the single "Maybe I'm Crazy" became a number-one hit in Denmark.

The next year, the single "Sunshine Reggae" was released, and it became another chart-topper in their home country; it was later included on the band's second album, Keep Smiling, in 1983, and went on to become a number-one single in Italy, West Germany, and nineteen other countries around the world. In the US, however, it was the single's B-side that became the band's only big hit. "White Horse" is a funk-influenced dance track with a memorable bassline and ambiguous, drug- and/or sex-themed lyrics ("white horse" being a slang for heroin) that became popular in US clubs. After the song was re-released as an A-side on both 7-inch and 12-inch vinyl, it went on to spend three weeks at number one on Billboards National Disco Action charts; it was also a crossover success, reaching the top five on the Hot Black Singles chart while peaking at number 26 on the Billboard Hot 100 in early 1984. Its relatively poor performance on the Hot 100 is most likely due to the track's controversial lyrics (including the word "bitch"), which prevented it from receiving radio airplay in much of the country. In 1989, the American rap act 2 Live Crew sampled "White Horse" heavily for their single "Get the Fuck Out of My House"; it was later sampled for Monifah's 1998 hit "Touch It".

Laid Back's next two albums, Play It Straight (1985) and See You in the Lobby (1987), and singles such as "Abu Dhabi" and "Tricky Kind of Thing", were released to little fanfare and limited chart success. 

The duo made a return to the European charts in 1989 with the single "Bakerman" (featuring Danish singer Hanne Boel), which peaked at number nine on the West German chart, and number 44 in the United Kingdom in early 1990. It was accompanied by an unusual video, directed by Lars von Trier, which featured the band skydiving while "playing" their instruments. Guldberg and Stahl have both named this their favourite Laid Back track, and said the words were written by Guldberg during the recording session for the song. The lyrics are in English except for the phrase "Sagabona kunjani", which Guldberg has described as a Swahili phrase meaning "Hello, how are you?"

Hoping to capitalize on the success of Bakerman, their label re-released "White Horse" (as "White Horse '89") with new remixes, although this was a commercial disappointment.

Later work
Over the course of the following two decades, Laid Back continues to work together, and have since released four albums, a handful of singles, and two greatest hits albums (Laidest Greatest in 1995 and Good Vibes – The Very Best of Laid Back in 2008). The duo also composed the soundtrack of the 2001 feature film Flyvende Farmor, for which they were awarded a Robert, the Danish equivalent of an Oscar. That same year, an exhibition of the band's artwork, including pieces that appeared on their records and promotional posters, took place in Copenhagen. In 2003 they featured on the track "Tango" by Danish band Hæst, produced by Umpff. They continue to make sporadic live performances, as well, including high-profile shows at the Isle of Wight Festival in 2004, and the Roskilde Festival in 2005. A remix of "Bakerman" by British DJ Shaun Baker reached number one in Greenland in 2006.

In 2010 Laid Back returned with the single "Cocaine Cool".

Discography

Albums
 Laid Back (1981)
 Keep Smiling (1983)
 Play It Straight (1985)
 See You in the Lobby (1987)
 Hole in the Sky (1990)
 Why Is Everybody in Such a Hurry (1993)
 Laidest Greatest (1995)
 Unfinished Symphonies (1999)
 Happy Dreamer (1999)
 Good Vibes – The Very Best of Laid Back (2008)
 Cosmic Vibes (2011)
 Cosyland (2012)
 Uptimistic Music (2013)
 Healing Feeling (2019)

Singles

See also
 List of artists who reached number one on the U.S. Dance Club Songs chart

References

External links
 
 

Danish dance music groups
Danish electronic music groups
Electronic music duos
Danish funk musical groups
Musical groups established in 1979
Sire Records artists
Danish new wave musical groups
Male musical duos
New wave duos
English-language singers from Denmark